Rok Maher (born 20 July 2001) is a Slovenian football midfielder who plays for Slovenian Second League side Bistrica, on loan from Maribor.

References

2001 births
Living people
Sportspeople from Slovenj Gradec
Slovenian footballers
Association football midfielders
Slovenia youth international footballers
Slovenia under-21 international footballers
NK Maribor players
NK Bravo players
Slovenian PrvaLiga players
Slovenian Second League players